A pub chain is a group of pubs or bars operating under a unified brand image. Pubs within a chain are tied houses and can, generally, only sell products which the chain owner sanctions. Pubs in a chain normally display their chain branding prominently and may also feature shared aspects, such as menus and staff uniforms.

The owner is often called a pubco and the chain may exist as a single operation or it may be a division of a larger company, such as a brewery.

History
Pub chains are an evolution of the tied house system. During the latter half of the nineteenth century increased competition between the large breweries led many of them to buy up local pubs and directly employ publicans to run them, in an attempt to secure markets for their products. Although tied houses had existed in some cities since the seventeenth century, this period has come to be known as the birth of the tied house system. As well as guaranteeing markets for a brewery, the tied house system allowed an uninterrupted supply chain, directly from the brewery to the pub, keeping costs down. A key difference to the system largely operating today is that most tied houses are now owned by pub chains, known as pubco's, who align themselves with specific suppliers in order to obtain big discounts, therefore reducing profits for the brewery.

Types
In the United Kingdom, there are two types of pub chain, reflecting the ownership of the pub and the style of operations.  Pubs are either tenanted or managed.

Pub chains such as Punch Taverns and Ei Group own thousands of tenanted pubs which are not branded to retain uniqueness. They are controlled in the brands of beer, ales and lagers and sometimes other beverages that they may sell.

Pub chains operating managed houses are frequently run as brands, located near a high street but rarely in predominantly residential areas.

Multiple-held pubs do exist in countries other than the United Kingdom, but due to most countries having different accepted systems of ownership and supply, they do not hold anywhere near the level of control over the market as they do in the UK.

See also

 List of bars § Public houses

References

 
Pubs in Australia
Pubs in the United Kingdom